Murid or Mureed is a village and union council in Chakwal District in the Punjab Province of Pakistan. It is located 10 km west of Chakwal and is part of Chakwal Tehsil. It has main Bazar also called "Maidan", chairman and his team hear the problems of people of Union Council Mureed 24/7 bases.

See also
 PAF Base Murid, an air base located there

References

Union councils of Chakwal District
Populated places in Chakwal District